Channagiri is a town in Davanagere district in the state of Karnataka, India. It is a taluk headquarters in Davanagere District from 1997. Before it was the part of Shivamogga District. It is also been called as “ Adike Naadu” for growing areca as major agricultural crop. Channagiri has historical stories associated with Keladi Nayakas. Channagiri is named after the Keladi queen Keladi cenamma.

Etymology
During Ganga Possession in this place called Asandinadu. Later goes under the rule of Kalyani Chalukya subsequently ruled by Pandyas of Uchchangi, later place passed into the hands of the Keladi Nayaka Kingdom in 17th century.
It is said that the hill was fortified by Rani Chennamma of Keladi (1672–1697), queen of Keladi Nayaka Kingdom and town was named after her.

Geography
It has an average elevation of 662 metres (2171 feet).

Demographics
 India census, Channagiri had a population of 18,517. Males constitute 52% of the population and females 48%. Channagiri has an average literacy rate of 71%, higher than the national average of 59.5%; with male literacy of 74% and female literacy of 67%. 13% of the population is under 6 years of age.

Hill Fort
Channagiri has a hill fort which was built around 1770 with a Ranganatha temple inside it, which rises to a height of about 200 feet to the west of the town consists of a single soft dark covered with earth which commands a wide plain. The fort consists of two rubble walls defending by moats, the chief gate being on the north where the gradient is lowest.

On the peak stands a temple dedicated to Sri Ranganatha. It is called Bete-Ranganatha and depicts Vishnu standing in samabhanga holding chakra and sankha in his back hands and arrow in his front hands with a low Garuda pedestal below him and a consort in relievo on the prabhavali on each side.

To its south-west is a small shrine dedicated to Bhutappa which contains the head of the god whose tongue projects out of his mouth.

Transportation
NH 369 passing through Channagiri and it connects between Chitradurga and Shivamoga.

Notable people 
 Dhondia Wagh, early freedom fighter, was born in Channagiri
 J. H. Patel, Former Chief minister of Karnataka.
 H. S. Venkateshamurthy, poet, playwright in Kannada Language.
 M. Chidananda Murthy, Kannada writer, researcher and historian.

See also
Shanti Sagara
Davanagere

References

External links

Cities and towns in Davanagere district
Forts in Karnataka